Cú Chulainn is a legendary hero in the Ulster Cycle of Irish mythology.

Cú Chulainn, Cuchulain, Cuchulainn, etc., may also refer to:

Cuchulain of Muirthemne, a 1902 book by Augusta, Lady Gregory
The Cú Chulainn Coaster, a roller coaster at Tayto Park in Ashbourne, Ireland
 "Lancer", the Lancer-class "Servant" of Bazett Fraga McRemitz in the Fate/stay Night series

See also
 Kerr Cuhulain, pen name of Charles Ennis, Canadian Wiccan author and retired detective
 Serglige Con Culainn (English: The Sick-Bed of Cú Chulainn), a story from Irish mythology.